Streptomyces albospinus is a bacterium species from the genus  of Streptomyces which has been isolated from soil from the Akita City in Japan. Streptomyces albospinus produces spinamycine, phenamide, phenelfamycin G and phenelfamycin H.

See also 
 List of Streptomyces species

References

Further reading

External links
Type strain of Streptomyces albospinus at BacDive -  the Bacterial Diversity Metadatabase

albospinus
Bacteria described in 1966